Aditya Chopra (born 21 May 1971) is an Indian filmmaker, film distributor, and studio executive. He is the current Chairman of India's multi-national film, media, and entertainment conglomerate Yash Raj Films (YRF). The films he has produced make him the highest grossing Indian film producer of all time.

Having denied Chopra admission into the NSD due to his severe stammering as a young applicant, the Film Division of India eventually honored him with the National Award for his achievements in 1995, 2005, 2007 and 2015.  Widely regarded as the most influential executive in Indian entertainment, Chopra has however rejected the publicity and fame that came with being Yash Chopra's son and the chief executive of Yash Raj Films.

Early life 
Chopra, the elder son of the late filmmaker Yash Chopra and Pamela Chopra, was born on 21 May 1971. He completed his formal education and acquired his Indian Certificate of Secondary Education from Bombay Scottish School. He graduated from Sydenham College of Commerce and Economics along with Anil Thadani, Karan Johar and Abhishek Kapoor.

Filmmaking career 
Chopra started his film-making career at the age of 18 as an assistant director, working with his father on films such as Chandni (1989), Lamhe (1991) and Darr (1993). He also wrote his first screenplays for his father's Parampara (1992) and his mother's independently produced film Aaina (1993), which was the only film not directed by his father that he served as an assistant director on.

Directorial debut and success 
Chopra, after gaining a respectable amount of experience, started independently at the age of 23 with the all-time blockbuster romantic comedy-drama Dilwale Dulhaniya Le Jayenge, with Shahrukh Khan and Kajol, for which he was the director and writer. The film was scripted by Chopra and produced by his father Yash Chopra, under the YRF banner. Chopra started work on the script of the film in 1990, at the age of 19, and gradually spent time making about five drafts of the film's original script. Chopra even managed to convince his brother Uday Chopra and Karan Johar, both aspiring filmmakers, to enter the film industry as assistant directors with the film. Chopra once said that the presence of his relatives during the making of the film worked as a huge emotional support. Dilwale Dulhaniya Le Jayenge eventually went on to become one of the biggest hits of all time and won the National Film Award for Best Popular Film Providing Wholesome Entertainment.

Extensive work in Yash Raj Films 
Chopra eventually went on to write the dialogues and the story of his father's 1997 blockbuster Dil To Pagal Hai, (which won the National Award), also made under YRF. His next film as a director was the musical romantic drama Mohabbatein with Amitabh Bachchan and Shahrukh Khan, and also launched his brother Uday Chopra into the film industry. The film was also written and co-produced by Chopra and fared very well at the box office. The next film under the banner was the romantic comedy Mere Yaar Ki Shaadi Hai, in June 2002 which also starred his brother Uday alongside Tulip Joshi, Bipasha Basu and Jimmy Sheirgill. The film did moderately well at the box office. The studio's final release that year was the romantic drama Saathiya in December 2002 which starred Vivek Oberoi opposite Rani Mukerji.

2004: breakthrough in production 
In 2004, Chopra produced Hum Tum, Dhoom and Veer-Zaara (for which he was also the screenwriter) under the YRF banner. The films became the sixth, third and highest-grossing Indian films of 2004. The company won most of the Indian film awards in the year, with Veer-Zaara also winning the National Award.

Chopra then produced and wrote several other highly critically and commercial acclaimed films over the years, namely Bunty Aur Babli, Salaam Namaste, Fanaa, Dhoom 2 and Chak De India (which also won the National Award). Chopra also made his third film as a director in 2008 with the romantic comedy Rab Ne Bana Di Jodi starring Shahrukh Khan and launching newcomer Anushka Sharma. The film became the highest-grossing film for Shahrukh Khan and YRF at that time, grossing  in the worldwide market.

YRF launched a number of budding screenwriters and directors under their banner throughout these years. Directors and screenwriters such as Karan Johar (his Kuch Kuch Hota Hai was co-produced and released by Yash Raj Film Distributors), Kunal Kohli, Kabir Khan, Sanjay Gadhvi, Jaideep Sahni, Siddharth Anand, Shimit Amin, Habib Faisal, Shaad Ali, Maneesh Sharma and Vijay Acharya debuted under YRF and have gone on to become independent entities in films. The company also produced films for filmmakers such as Anil Mehta and Pradeep Sarkar under their banner. The company was eventually ranked at Number 1 (among the most successful film production companies in India) in a survey conducted by Filmfare and at Number 27 (among the most successful film production companies in the world) in a survey by The Hollywood Reporter, both under the vice-chairmanship of Chopra.

Return to film direction: Befikre (2016) 
In September 2015, YRF announced Chopra's directorial comeback, titled Befikre, scheduled for a December 2016 release. In October 2015, it was announced that Ranveer Singh and Vaani Kapoor would be cast in the lead roles. In December 2015, YRF announced that the music of the film will be produced by Vishal–Shekhar and Jaideep Sahni, both of whom would return to collaborate with YRF after roughly 9 years. This would mark Chopra's directorial comeback after roughly 8 years (his Rab Ne Bana Di Jodi released in 2008). A theatrical trailer of the film was released at the Eiffel Tower and across social media platforms in the month of October. It opened to widespread negative reviews across platforms and faced heavy losses to its business because of the currency demonetisation implied by the Government of India a few days prior to its release. The film managed to gross  after a two-week theatrical run at the global box office failing to manage break-even business for YRF.

Career as studio executive

In 2004, Chopra started producing under the YRF banner. The films became the sixth, third and highest-grossing Indian films of 2004. The company won most of the Indian film awards in the year, with Veer-Zaara also winning the National Award.

The company saw an all-time low, with several of their high budgeted films not doing well at the box office, despite favourable critical reviews and the company thereby suffering losses amounting to millions from 2007 to 2010. The films broke YRF's perfect success ratio and were oddly released one after another. Some of the most unsuccessful films produced under the banner were Jhoom Barabar Jhoom, Laaga Chunari Mein Daag, Tashan, Thoda Pyaar Thoda Magic, Roadside Romeo, and Pyaar Impossible. Chopra then took over as the Vice Chairman of Yash Raj Films in 2010, soon after the release of the film Badmaash Company under the same banner.

Chopra has produced several commercially viable projects including off-beat content not necessarily fitting into the realm of "masala films". Chopra is the first to move towards the film studio model through independent projects helmed by talent under his banner. Major post-production work of the company is completed at YRF Studios (co-founded by his ex-wife Payal Khanna), where Chopra serves as Chief Executive.  The Government of India appealed both Chopra and Mani Ratnam to focus on content created locally under its Make in India and Atmanirbhar Bharat initiatives. In June 2018, he was awarded membership into the Academy of Motion Picture Arts and Sciences by the Producers Guild of America. Apart from emerging as an equitable brand, his company earned the status of a movie mogul through distribution networks spread across the globe. In May 2020, Chopra refused licensing deals with Amazon, Netflix, and with Apple TV+ opting for traditional film exhibition. YRF finalised plans to launch its own OTT service with Tata ELXSI the same year.

Legal issues and controversies

Ghajini 
Photographers of the Indian media caught a glimpse of the extremely reclusive Chopra on 27 December 2008. Chopra's Rab Ne Bana Di Jodi and Aamir Khan's Ghajini were the two big Indian releases of the year 2008 and were pitted against each other by the Press; Rab Ne Bana Di Jodi was to release on Diwali and Ghajini was to release on Christmas, with a gap of a few weeks between them. Chopra was present at a private screening of Ghajini that was held by Khan, for members of the film industry. Chopra was seen leaving through the back entrance of the theatre premise around 2 AM, just before the end credits of the film. On spotting multiple journalists outside the venue, he reportedly panicked and desperately sprinted towards his car to avoid being photographed. Chopra pulled down the sun visor of his car and hid inside it as he drove away. He even dropped his phone and damaged it, in the process. Images of a scared and petrified Chopra covering his face with his arms became front-page news of a leading Indian tabloid. The article called Chopra a very powerful man, behaving like a trapped animal, even though it carried a statement by "one of his close friends" who called him a simple, introverted guy. The event however fuelled further reports of Chopra having an alleged social anxiety disorder and/or APD.

Acquisition by Walt Disney 
The Walt Disney Company entered India in 2007 through a co-production agreement (Ta Ra Rum Pum, Thoda Pyaar Thoda Magic, and Roadside Romeo) with YRF. Disney's move was seen as a bid to increase its global presence and enter Indian entertainment. This was followed by Warner Bros., Columbia Pictures, Universal Pictures, and 20th Century Fox, who made similar moves.

Post the release of the three films, Disney attempted a  hostile takeover of YRF in December 2009. The offer was pushed after its acquisitions of Pixar and Marvel from the previous year. YRF however fought the offer and continued as a domestic entity, heavily aided by the Tata Sons. This was followed by the exits of Dick Cook from Walt Disney and Sanjeev Kohli  from YRF. Records from the Registrar of Companies of the same year showed that YRF received investments from LIC of India, Catamaran Ventures, and Maruti-Udyog.

In December 2016, Disney-UTV announced a temporary closure of its offices. After the release of its final film in July 2017, Disney exited all film operations in India and was permanently liquidated. In January 2019, YRF reached a  valuation by SEBI, thereby making it the largest Indian film production company of all time.

Son of Sardaar 
In 2012, Ajay Devgan, Viacom 18 Motion Pictures and Eros International together moved the Competition Commission of India against Yash Raj Films and Aditya Chopra, accusing the company of using monopolistic business practices and rampantly abusing their dominant position and clout in the Entertainment Industry of India by entering into a tie-in arrangement with 1,500 single screen film exhibitors (out of a total of 2,100) of India, that obliged them to showcase the company's Jab Tak Hai Jaan (and not Son of Sardaar) on the Diwali week of 2012 and continue its theatrical run for two weeks after the worldwide release. The trio eventually moved the Competition Appellate Tribunal on 30 October 2012 against YRF but were turned down by the bench heading the Tribunal.

Both films opened on 13 November 2012; Jab Tak Hai Jaan released on 3500 screens and Son of Sardar released on 2000 screens, in the worldwide market. However, in November 2013, the CCI dismissed the case filing as they found YRF to not be in contravention of the Competition Act of India; YRF won the case.

Raees 
Raees was a film produced by Excel Entertainment and Red Chillies Entertainment helmed by Rahul Dholakia. Principal photography of the film was completed in April 2015 and a few months were allotted to its post-production work. A teaser/trailer of the film was released across social media platforms and attached to Bajrangi Bhaijaan on 17 July 2015 announcing it as a 5 July 2016 release; packaged and presented as an Eid project. However, sensing an opportunity in the same period, YRF went ahead to green-light its own Sultan, slated for release on the same day, in January 2016. Principal photography with Salman Khan and Anushka Sharma was completed in 3 months followed by post-production work being completed in May. A teaser/trailer and other marketing material featuring both Khan and Sharma were released simultaneously starting in April across platforms and networks. The film was ready for a 5 July release and as a result, around 4230 theatre screens available in India would have been divided among the two films.

Realising a loss in business to both films, Ritesh Sidhwani and Shahrukh Khan, the producers of Raees approached Chopra to work out a settlement to ensure both projects are exhibited comfortably across centres. However, Chopra disagreed to shift his release date stating the poor performance of Khan's prior releases (Dilwale and Fan) in the global box office. Moreover, Chopra ensured that YRF Distributors (his film distribution leg) exhibit Sultan to more than 3100 screens (out of the total 4230), apparently abusing his dominant position and clout in the Entertainment Industry of India, an allegation that he has battled several times in the past.

Sultan eventually released on 6 July 2016, as planned by YRF, across 4310 Indian screens and 1130 screens internationally, to gross  in the worldwide market and Raees was postponed to 26 January 2017, scheduled to release alongside Kaabil on the same day.

Paani 
In November 2012, YRF green-lit their first Indian-American war drama co-production titled Paani with DreamWorks Pictures. The film was to be helmed by Shekhar Kapur and Sushant Singh Rajput was signed for the lead role in December of the same year. Principal photography was to start in June 2013, and it was planned as a December 2015 release by both Chopra and Kapur. A. R. Rahman was roped in to score the music of the film and pre-production work started in January 2013 with the entire cast and crew at YRF Studios.

In February 2013, Sanjay Leela Bhansali offered the lead role to Rajput in his Shakespearean tragic romance Ram-Leela, which was scheduled to be shot throughout the year 2013. Chopra, however, advised Rajput to turn down the role to focus solely on Paani and led Bhansali to sign Ranveer Singh (through YRF Talent) instead. In November 2013, Chopra shelved Paani stating the poor financial performance of Rajput's Shuddh Desi Romance and affordability issues faced by YRF during pre-production work. Ram-Leela meanwhile opened to overwhelming critical and box office success in the same period with both Bhansali and Singh being awarded extensively for their work.

Rajput was later signed for another independent YRF projects; Detective Byomkesh Bakshy scheduled to release in April 2015.

Pathaan 
On 12 December 2022, YRF released a song from the fourth project of its spy universe titled Besharam Rang across all media platforms. Picturised on Deepika Padukone and Shahrukh Khan in the outskirts of Benicàssim, the song was written by Vishal–Shekhar and Kumaar. Choreography and direction was by Vaibhavi Merchant. A few days after release of the song, it started gaining criticism among right-wing ideologists for its lyrics, Padukone's appearance in a saffron bikini, and Khan's appearance in green trousers. A boycott call on Twitter by the name "#BoycottPathaan" began to trend with a section of users calling the visuals “vulgar” and "infuriating".

Chopra wrote to the Office of the Prime Minister explaining this issue a week before the release of the film. On 18 January 2023, the Prime Minister of India sent out a warning to the workers of all national political parties to "strictly refrain from making comments on films". It was the first-ever public statement strategically released by the PMO to safeguard the release of a film in India. The Ministry for Information and Broadcasting further cautioned political leaders and workers against making remarks on important films. Followingly, the state governments of Gujarat, Uttar Pradesh, Madhya Pradesh, and Assam assured YRF protection for its viewers and assurance that protestors will be strictly prosecuted. On 24 January 2023, a day before the release of the film, the Vishva Hindu Parishad released a statement to its members that they were "satisfied" with the certification of the film and assured that all protests will be ceased.

At the time of the statement, Pathaan was slated to be screened in 5500+ movie theatres in India and 2500+ movie theatres in more than 100 countries internationally thereby making it the most widely released Indian film of all time. After two days of its release, 25 additional screens were added after the Chief Justice of Delhi High Court directed Chopra to add an exclusive version of the film for people with disabilities.

On 3 March 2023, Pathaan emerged as the highest grossing Hindi film of all time.

Personal life
He was married to Payal Khanna, until their divorce in 2009. The couple had no children. On 21 April 2014, he married actress Rani Mukerji in a private wedding ceremony in Italy. In December 2015, Rani gave birth to their daughter Adira Chopra.

He has remained extremely media-shy and a passive individual, battling constant reports of an alleged dysthymic disorder throughout his three-decade career, resulting in very few public photos of him being in existence. In 2023, Chopra sat down for an extensive interview for the first time in 28 years for the Netflix series The Romantics, which highlights the rise of Yash Raj Films.

Works

Film

‡Theatrical release exclusively

Television

Stage

See also 
 List of Hindi film clans
 List of highest-grossing Bollywood films

References

Further reading

External links 

 

1971 births
Living people
Filmfare Awards winners
Hindi film producers
Indian male screenwriters
Telstra People's Choice Award winners
Hindi-language film directors
Yash Raj Films people
Film producers from Mumbai
Film directors from Mumbai
Indian film distributors
Hindi screenwriters
Screen Awards winners
20th-century Indian film directors
21st-century Indian film directors
20th-century Indian dramatists and playwrights
21st-century Indian dramatists and playwrights
Screenwriters from Maharashtra
20th-century Indian male writers
21st-century Indian male writers
Producers who won the Best Popular Film Providing Wholesome Entertainment National Film Award
Directors who won the Best Popular Film Providing Wholesome Entertainment National Film Award
Producers who won the Best Debut Feature Film of a Director National Film Award